Ecuador competed at the 1976 Summer Olympics in Montreal, Quebec, Canada.

Results and competitors by event

Diving
 Nelson Suárez

Judo
 Enrique Del Valle
 Jhonny Mackay

Swimming
 Jorge Delgado

Wrestling
 Marco Terán

References
Ecuador Olympic Committee
Official Olympic Reports
sports-reference

Nations at the 1976 Summer Olympics
1976 Summer Olympics
1976 in Ecuadorian sport